Tomingley is a town in the Central West region of New South Wales, Australia. Tomingley is famous for gold mining and owes its origin to that. It is also known for the story that after WWII the military disposed of a large quantity of guns and other war materials down the biggest mine in the area.

References

External links

Towns in New South Wales
Towns in the Central West (New South Wales)
Populated places in New South Wales
Localities in New South Wales
Mining towns in New South Wales